Alan Robert Rogowski (born September 22, 1942), better known by the ring name Ole Anderson, is an American retired professional wrestler, referee, manager, and promoter. Part of the Anderson family, Anderson was a founding member of the influential stable The Four Horsemen.

Professional wrestling career

American Wrestling Association (1967–1968) 
Anderson started wrestling in 1967 in the American Wrestling Association (AWA) as Rock Rogowski.

Jim Crockett Promotions (1968–1970) 

In mid-1968, Anderson began wrestling for the Carolinas-based Jim Crockett Promotions. He adopted the ring name Ole Anderson (a play-on-words referring to the toxic shrub oleander) and became a member of the legendary tag team called the Minnesota Wrecking Crew with his kayfabe brother Gene Anderson after Lars Anderson left the team in the late 1960s.  He appeared regularly with the promotion until September 1970.

Championship Wrestling from Florida (1971–1972) 
In July 1971, Anderson began wrestling for the Florida-based Championship Wrestling from Florida promotion. During his time in Florida, Anderson held the NWA Florida Tag Team Championship and NWA Florida Television Championship. He left the promotion in spring 1972.

Jim Crockett Promotions / Georgia Championship Wrestling (1972–1985) 

From 1972 to 1985, Anderson wrestled primarily for Jim Crockett Promotions and Georgia Championship Wrestling. From the mid-1970s through the early 1980s, The Minnesota Wrecking Crew became synonymous with tag team wrestling in the Georgia and Mid-Atlantic territories by capturing the NWA Georgia Tag Team Championship and the Mid-Atlantic territorial version of the NWA World Tag Team Championship 7 times each. The Andersons feuded with such stars as Mr. Wrestling and Mr. Wrestling II, Wahoo McDaniel, Jack Brisco, Jerry Brisco, Dusty Rhodes,  Tommy Rich, Johnny Weaver, Dino Bravo, Paul Jones, Ric Flair, Greg Valentine, Ricky Steamboat, Rufus R. Jones, The Mongols, and Thunderbolt Patterson throughout the 1970s and early 1980s. Behind the scenes, Anderson was also the primary booker for GCW and also had a stint booking JCP in 1981–82. For a time he even booked both companies simultaneously, often combining both rosters for supercards which were noted for offering some of the best action in the business at that time. He later left JCP to book and wrestle for GCW full-time. When Jack and Jerry Brisco sold their majority interest in the GCW promotion to Vince McMahon, Anderson resisted the change, and joined forces with longtime NWA-sanctioned promoters Fred Ward and Ralph Freed to start a new company called Championship Wrestling from Georgia.

Jim Crockett Promotions / World Championship Wrestling (1985–1994)

The Minnesota Wrecking Crew (1985–1986) 

In April 1985, Jim Crockett Promotions and Championship Wrestling from Georgia essentially merged. Anderson was teaming with Thunderbolt Patterson in GCW just as Marty Lunde was debuting in JCP as Arn Anderson. It seemed like a natural fit to put the two Andersons together, especially considering their similar facial appearance. Anderson soon turned on Thunderbolt and teamed with Arn as the Minnesota Wrecking Crew.

The Four Horsemen (1986–1987) 

In 1986, Anderson became part of the original The Four Horsemen, a heel stable, with Ric Flair, Arn Anderson, Tully Blanchard, and manager J. J. Dillon. During his time in the Horsemen, Anderson feuded with Magnum T. A., Dusty Rhodes, The Rock 'N Roll Express and The Road Warriors. Anderson was later kicked out of the group in favor of Lex Luger in early 1987. Anderson retired in 1987, when his son, Bryant, was starting his own amateur wrestling career. Bryant later joined World Championship Wrestling (WCW) wrestling under the ring name of Bryant Anderson.

Tag team with Lex Luger (1988) 
Anderson reappeared in 1988 when he rescued Lex Luger from a beating by their former Horsemen brethren.

The Four Horsemen (1989–1990) 

Anderson returned to wrestling with WCW in 1989 to reform the Four Horsemen with Flair, Arn and Sting. They quickly kicked Sting out of the group, and Anderson retired again to manage the Horsemen, who by then also included Barry Windham and Sid Vicious.

World Wide Wrestling /Backstage roles (1990–1995) 
By 1990, he decided to wrestle in smaller local promotions such as World Wide Wrestling (WWW). He reformed the Minnesota Wrecking Crew with Burt Young aka “Paulie” or Paulie Anderson.  He feuded with the companies top stars Enforcer Tortoriello, The Future Marcus Valentin, SRA Aluggi, and Bob Beatrice. The Wrecking Crew had three reigns as tag team champions defeating Poisoner Vitale and John Kuklinski twice and Lord of War Berry and Drill Sergeant Willams once. In 1995 he returned to head the booking committee for WCW, which was at that time beginning to phase out the use of the NWA name on its television programming. Appearing in the credits for WCW pay-per-views under his real name, Anderson was responsible for some of the more infamous creative ideas tried by WCW. Among his creations were The Black Scorpion, which was intended to be a nemesis from Sting's past. After several miscues, the Scorpion's identity was eventually revealed as Ric Flair, in a ploy to confuse Sting and force him to lose the WCW World Heavyweight Championship back to Flair. For this, Anderson was dismissed as head booker by Herd, who despised Flair. In 1992, Anderson became a referee. After Bill Watts was ousted in 1993, Anderson took control of WCW.

When Eric Bischoff took over control of WCW in 1994, both Anderson and his son became a casualty of Bischoff's "house cleaning" when Bischoff fired Bryant while he was training at the WCW Power Plant. This prompted Anderson to call Smoky Mountain Wrestling promoter and head booker Jim Cornette to try to get his son a job. Anderson's decision to deal with Cornette, someone Bischoff was on bad terms with, on WCW property, was the factor that led to his firing. Bischoff fired Anderson over the phone, even though he spoke to Anderson face-to-face the day before. The chain of events was covered in a shoot interview by Cornette.

Retirement (1996–present) 
Since that time, he has stayed away from the sport, but wrote a book on it titled Inside Out. He has also hinted at having animosity with former partner and friend Ric Flair after criticizing him for wrestling the same kind of match for years. In his WWE biography, Flair recalled that upon returning to WCW from the WWF in 1993, Ole - who was WCW's head booker at the time - asked what good he was to WCW after losing a loser-leaves-town match with Mr. Perfect on national TV. Flair took this as a personal attack and it led to his ending their friendship. In July 2007, Gerweck.net reported that Anderson has multiple sclerosis and had gotten worse with decreased mobility and memory loss. Anderson has also been vocal about his personal issues with Vince McMahon, Dusty Rhodes, Michael Hayes, Paul Heyman, Eric Bischoff, Tully Blanchard, Jim Herd, Roddy Piper, Bruiser Brody and Lex Luger.

On February 27, 2011, it was announced that Anderson had been nursing broken ribs due to a fall he had earlier that day, as well as a broken arm.

Bibliography 
Inside Out: How Corporate America Destroyed Professional Wrestling (2003)

Championships and accomplishments
American Wrestling Association
AWA Midwest Heavyweight Championship (2 times)
AWA Midwest Tag Team Championship (2 times) – with Ox Baker (1), and The Claw (1)
Championship Wrestling from Florida
NWA Florida Television Championship (1 time)
NWA Florida Tag Team Championship (1 time) – with Ron Garvin
Georgia Championship Wrestling
NWA Columbus Heavyweight Championship (1 time)
NWA Georgia Tag Team Championship (17 times) – with Gene Anderson (7), Ivan Koloff (5), Lars Anderson (2), Rene Goulet (1), Ernie Ladd (1), and Jerry Brisco (1)
NWA Georgia Television Championship (2 times)
NWA Macon Heavyweight Championship (1 time)
NWA Macon Tag Team Championship (1 time) – with Gene Anderson
NWA National Tag Team Championship (1 time) – with Thunderbolt Patterson (1)
NWA Southeastern Tag Team Championship (Georgia version) (1 time) – with Gene Anderson
Mid-Atlantic Championship Wrestling / Jim Crockett Promotions / World Championship Wrestling
NWA Eastern States Heavyweight Championship (1 time)
NWA National Tag Team Championship (1 time) – with Arn Anderson
NWA Mid-Atlantic Tag Team Championship (3 times) – with Gene Anderson
NWA Atlantic Coast Tag Team Championship (4 times) – with Gene Anderson
NWA World Tag Team Championship (Mid-Atlantic version) (8 times) – with Gene Anderson (7), and Stan Hansen (1)
WCW Hall of Fame (Class of 1994)
National Wrestling Alliance
NWA Hall of Fame (class of 2010)
Pro Wrestling Illustrated
PWI Tag Team of the Year (1975, 1977) – with Gene Anderson
PWI ranked him #74 of the top 500 singles wrestlers of the "PWI Years" in 2003
Southeastern Championship Wrestling
NWA Southeastern Heavyweight Championship (Northern Division) (1 time)
Wrestling Observer Newsletter
Tag Team of the Year (1982) with Stan Hansen

See also
Anderson family
The Four Horsemen
The Minnesota Wrecking Crew

References

External links
 
 

1942 births
American male professional wrestlers
Anderson family
The Four Horsemen (professional wrestling) members
Living people
People with multiple sclerosis
Professional wrestlers from Minneapolis
Professional wrestling managers and valets
Professional wrestling promoters
Professional wrestling referees
Professional wrestling trainers
World Championship Wrestling executives
20th-century professional wrestlers
NWA Florida Tag Team Champions
NWA Florida Television Champions
WCW World Tag Team Champions
NWA Macon Heavyweight Champions
NWA Macon Tag Team Champions
NWA Georgia Tag Team Champions
NWA National Tag Team Champions
NWA National Television Champions